Dominik Prokop (born 2 June 1997) is an Austrian professional football player who plays as attacking midfielder for TSV Hartberg on loan from Croatian club Gorica.

Club career

Early career 
Born in Vienna, Prokop started his football career with Austria Wien. He played in ÖFB-Nachwuchs and scored 15 goals in 38 games.

Austria Wien
On 1 January 2016, Prokop has signed his first professional contract with Austria Wien for 2.5-years. He made his league debut on 10 April 2016 against SV Grödig at Franz Horr Stadium, replacing Raphael Holzhauser in a game Austria Wien lost by 2–0. On 14 July 2016, Prokop played in the UEFA Europa League against FK Kukësi as a starter for the first time. He scored his first goal for Austria Wien on 20 October 2016 at matchday three of the 2016–17 UEFA Europa League group stage against AS Roma in the 82nd minute.

International career 
Prokop has played for his country at all under-age levels. He participated at the 2014 UEFA European Under-17 Championship and the 2015 UEFA European Under-19 Championship, and made 15 appearances for the Austrian under-21 team.

Personal life
Prokop's younger brother, Lukas Prokop, is also a professional footballer who plays for Rheindorf Altach.

Club career statistics

References 

1997 births
Footballers from Vienna
Living people
Austrian footballers
Austria youth international footballers
Austria under-21 international footballers
Association football midfielders
FK Austria Wien players
SV Wehen Wiesbaden players
HNK Gorica players
TSV Hartberg players
Austrian Regionalliga players
Austrian Football Bundesliga players
2. Liga (Austria) players
3. Liga players
Croatian Football League players
Austrian expatriate footballers
Expatriate footballers in Germany
Austrian expatriate sportspeople in Germany
Expatriate footballers in Croatia
Austrian expatriate sportspeople in Croatia